Sereyn (also Romanized as Sareyen, Sarīn, and Serīn; also known as Sūzīn) is a village in Zarrineh Rud Rural District, Bizineh Rud District, Khodabandeh County, Zanjan Province, Iran. At the 2006 census, its population was 447, in 79 families.

References 

Populated places in Khodabandeh County